The 1990 Junior League World Series took place from August 13–18 in Taylor, Michigan, United States. Yabucoa, Puerto Rico defeated San Antonio, Texas in the championship game. It was Puerto Rico's second straight championship.

This year featured the debut of the Europe Region.

Teams

Results

References

Junior League World Series
Junior League World Series
Junior